James Bryson Angel (25 June 1940 – 24 December 2007) was an Australian radio news presenter. During a career spanning more than four decades, he presented the news on Sydney radio stations 2SM, 2UE, 2GB and 2CH, and many affiliated radio stations around Australia. He worked on-air with radio personalities such as John Laws and Alan Jones. After retirement in 2001, he joined community radio station Highland FM in Bowral as a volunteer breakfast announcer. Angel died on Christmas Eve 2007 at his home in the Southern Highlands after suffering a stroke.

Tributes 
The Premier of New South Wales, Morris Iemma, described Angel as a radio icon, saying "many people grew up listening to Jim read the news. Jim was a true professional and a real one of a kind. He will be sorely missed."
2UE program director Greg Byrnes stated that "with radio stations packed with big voices and big egos, he was the exception: he was a big voice with no ego."
2GB current affairs director Jason Morrison said "for him every news bulletin was opening night. He was the most unlikely star at the station. He never really understood how many people were aware of who he was and what he did. He set the standard of the way news was presented."

References

External links 
IN MEMORIAM – JIM ANGEL
Jim Angel's obituary on Highland FM website
Listen here as John Laws interrupts Angel's news broadcast and convinces him to sing Winchester Cathedral
Angel announces Labor's election victory in 1972
One of Jim Angel's first news reports, the 1964 Sydney International Toy Fair

Australian radio personalities
Radio in Sydney
People from New South Wales
1940 births
2007 deaths